2017–18 BBL season may refer to:
 2017–18 British Basketball League
 2017–18 Basketball Bundesliga